Loizza Aquino is a Canadian mental health activist. She speaks publicly on mental health and women empowerment and founded Peace of Mind Canada.

Early life and education 
Loizza Aquino was born September 17, 1999, in Manila, Philippines, but a year later moved Canada with her family. She has two siblings, Gian Aquino (Brother) and Lorhiz Aquino (Sister) and her parents are Lorna Ilag Aquino (Mother) and Rizalino Aquino (Father). She attended high school in Winnipeg, Manitoba, Canada as well as the Institut Collegial Vincent Massey Collegiate. In 2017, she began her studies at the University of Toronto Scarborough.

Loizza Aquino told Flare In an interview that her first job was at a Dairy Queen at the age of 14. She expanded that she was excited about her salary. 

Being an immigrant from the Philippines has impacted Aquino's life and provided a lot of challenges. Aquino believes that there is always a lesson to be learned from challenges and uses this belief to infuse her work in mental health advocacy.

Loizza received an Honours Bachelor of Science in Psychology and Health Sciences from the University of Toronto in 2021, with a double major in International Development and Mental Health, a minor in Media Studies and a certificate in Global Development, Environment & Health.

Activism

Peace Of Mind 
When Aquino was 15 years old, a sophomore in high school, she lost her best friend to suicide. Her friend was one of four students in Winnipeg who had died by suicide within the span of one month in 2015. After these traumatic events, Loizza Aquino wanted to create a place for community members to grieve and cope together. Aquino has founded a group titled Peace of Mind, aiming to create a mental health advocacy group in her high school. The organization implements programs for teens in Manitoba and Ontario, which involves planning events that provide a safe space for youth to share their personal stories. What began with just ten students has now expanded to multiple high schools across Manitoba and Ontario, with over 2,000 students participating.

Loizza Aquino brought her organization Peace of Mind onto her college campus at U of T Scarborough with the hopes that her organization may provide another source of mental health support on campus. One of the main goals of her organization is to bridge the gap between peers and keep the conversation going. Aquino's organization, Peace of Mind Canada, holds an event called Youth Against Mental Health and Illness Stigma (YAMHIS). The goal of this organization is to create a safe space for youth to talk about their experiences with mental health issues. Aquino advocates for mental health resources in Universities under the belief that a degree “doesn't really matter” without the tools to cope with mental health issues.

Awards 

 In 2014 Loizza Aquino received a young humanitarian award from the Manitoba Teachers' Society
 In June 2017 she received a $70,000 community leadership scholarship from TD Bank to pursue her post-secondary education in Canada. Due to this she left home in Winnipeg and moved to Toronto.
 On June 19, 2018, Aquino was named a recipient of the Top 25 Canadian Immigrant Awards.
 Later in 2018 she received a peace medallion presented by the YMCA of Greater Toronto alongside Police Constable Dale Swift and President of the Toronto Raptors, Masai Ujiri

References

External links 

 Loizza Aquino's personal Website.
 Peace of Mind Canada

1999 births
Living people
Canadian health activists